Saratoga High School is a grade 9–12, public high school located in Saratoga, California. It is ranked No. 1 Best College Prep Public High School in California according to Niche.

Academics

Saratoga High School is consistently designated a top academic high school. It is one of two schools in the Los Gatos-Saratoga Joint Union High School District, which is ranked the Best School District in California.
 
Saratoga High School has a four-year Project Lead the Way engineering program, and is ranked No. 23 in the U.S. for science, technology, engineering, and mathematics (STEM). The school offers 35 honors and Advanced Placement courses.

The graduation rate is 99%, and 97% of students attend college. It is jointly accredited by the California Department of Education and the Western Association of Schools and Colleges.  

Student enrollment averages around 1300, with a student-teacher ratio of 20:1. It is a diverse high school, with total minority enrollment of 75%. The school community includes families that speak 39 languages.

In 2017, Saratoga High School was named a California Gold Ribbon School for the strength of its Student Support Programs and its focus on Social Emotional Learning.

Activities

Athletics

The Saratoga Falcons compete in the Santa Clara Valley Athletic League (SCVAL) of the CIF Central Coast Section (CCS).

More than 60% of students participate in Saratoga High School athletics. From 2015 to 2020, every varsity team competed in the CCS playoffs; titles and runners up were earned in Boys and Girls Tennis, Boys and Girls Basketball, Boys Cross Country, Boys Volleyball, and Badminton. In addition, individual medals were won in Wrestling and Boys and Girls Track and Field. In 2019, the Boys Golf Team finished No. 4 in California. Boys Volleyball won two Northern California championships in 2016 and 2017.

Saratoga Football has won five CIF Central Coast Section championships: 1973, 1976, 1980, 1987, 1996. The team formerly played night games at Los Gatos High School; in April 2006, the Trustees of the Los Gatos-Saratoga Joint Union High School District approved permanent lights for the football field.

SHS Baseball won a Division II CCS championship in 1999.

In 2009, the girls' varsity tennis team defeated rival Monta Vista High School 5-2 for their first CCS championship in the history of the program and went on to win the title again in 2010.

Theater Arts and Music

Performing Arts is a strong area of achievement at Saratoga High School. Almost 40% of students perform onstage through theater arts, vocal ensembles and instrumental music. The Saratoga Strings orchestra performed in the prestigious Midwest Clinic International Band and Orchestra Conference in Chicago, Illinois in 2018. The Marching Band and Color Guard marched in the 2016 Tournament of Roses Parade in Pasadena, California. The Marching Band participated in the 2012 Macy's Parade in New York City.

Chess team

At the 2005 National Grade Level Chess Championships in Houston, the 9th graders were national champions. The team won the NorCal State Championship for a record six consecutive years (2004–2010).

Campus

The school has 8 tennis courts, an all weather track, an artificial turf football field, an artificial turf soccer field, an artificial turf softball field, a quad, and an Olympic-size swimming pool. The McAfee Performing Arts and Lecture Center, a community facility, opened in 2006.

Notable alumni

 Mark Ames (1983) – journalist
 Zach Gill (1993) – musician
 Lance Guest (1978) – actor
 Lee Hancock (1985) – MLB player
 Bill Haselman (1984) – MLB player and coach
 Dan Janjigian (1991) – actor and bobsledder
 Alex Lagemann (2007) – musician
 Beth Lisick (1987) – author
 Patricia Miranda (1997) – bronze medalist in wrestling at 2004 Summer Olympics
 Cyndy Poor (1971) – 1976 Olympian and American record holder
 Anil Raj (2002) – human rights activist, Amnesty International board member, killed in Kabul while working on United Nations Development Programme.
 Kyle Shanahan (1993) – head coach of NFL's San Francisco 49ers
 Varun Sivaram (2007) – Rhodes Scholar, CTO of ReNew Power, and author
 Ed Solomon (1978) – actor, director, writer and producer
 Steven Spielberg (1965) – Academy Award-winning film director
 Carrie Steinseifer (1986) – 1984 Olympic swimmer
 Mark Suciu (2010) – professional skateboarder
 Vienna Teng (1996) – singer-songwriter
 David Warshofsky (1979) – actor

See also

Suicide of Audrie Pott

Notes

External links
 Saratoga High School official web site
 Saratoga High School principals

Educational institutions established in 1959
Saratoga, California
High schools in Santa Clara County, California
Public high schools in California
1959 establishments in California